Umbonium moniliferum is a species of sea snail, a marine gastropod mollusk in the family Trochidae, the top snails.

Description
The size of the shell varies between 10 mm and 20 mm. The solid shell is depressed with a very low, conoidal spire. Its color pattern is yellow, pinkish or whitish, closely tessellated with purple-brown or bluish slate-color, the basal callus purplish flesh-colored. Its surface is shining, polished, with spiral sulci above, generally 3–5 in number on the body whorl, often subobsolete. The suture is sometimes margined by a row of prominent tubercles, 8 to 11 on the body whorl. The shell contains about six whorls, the last rounded at the periphery, convex beneath. The callus is quite heavy, convex and circular.

Distribution
This marine species occurs off Japan.

References

 MacDonald & Co (1979). The MacDonald Encyclopedia of Shells. MacDonald & Co. London & Sydney.

External links

 

moniliferum
Gastropods described in 1822